Charles Strack (July 15, 1899 – May 13, 1967) was an American wrestler. He competed in the freestyle light heavyweight event at the 1924 Summer Olympics.

References

1899 births
1967 deaths
Olympic wrestlers of the United States
Wrestlers at the 1924 Summer Olympics
American male sport wrestlers
People from Nyack, New York
Sportspeople from New York (state)
People from Spring Valley, New York